Seated Yucatán Woman is a bronze sculpture, by Francisco Zúñiga.  It is an edition of four, one of which is located at the Hirshhorn Museum and Sculpture Garden.

The artist depicts the grace and dignity of peasant women in Mexico.

According to Ariel Zuñiga, the correct title of the piece is Juchiteca sentada (Seated Juchiteca).

See also
 List of public art in Washington, D.C., Ward 2

References

External links
Waymarking

1973 sculptures
Bronze sculptures in Washington, D.C.
Hirshhorn Museum and Sculpture Garden
Sculptures of the Smithsonian Institution
Sculptures of women in Washington, D.C.
Statues in Washington, D.C.
Outdoor sculptures in Washington, D.C.